Maximiliano Caufriez (born 16 February 1997) is a Belgian professional footballer who plays as a centre-back and right-back for  club Clermont, on loan from Russian Premier League club Spartak Moscow.

Club career
Caufriez was born and raised in Mons where started to play as a youth. Later, he joined Waasland-Beveren. He made his Belgian Pro League debut on 4 April 2016 against Mouscron.

On 29 August 2021, he signed a long-term contract with Russian Premier League club Spartak Moscow. On 29 May 2022, he won the Russian Cup after almost a decade of unsuccessful runs for Spartak in the competition. 

On 29 August 2022, Caufriez joined Ligue 1 club Clermont on loan for the 2022–23 season.

Career statistics

Honours 
Spartak Moscow
Russian Cup: 2021–22

References

External links

Living people
1997 births
Sportspeople from Mons
Belgian footballers
Footballers from Hainaut (province)
Association football central defenders
R.A.E.C. Mons players
R.S.C. Anderlecht players
Standard Liège players
S.K. Beveren players
Sint-Truidense V.V. players
FC Spartak Moscow players
Clermont Foot players
Belgian Pro League players
Russian Premier League players
Ligue 1 players
Belgium youth international footballers
Belgium under-21 international footballers
Belgian expatriate footballers
Expatriate footballers in Russia
Belgian expatriate sportspeople in Russia
Expatriate footballers in France
Belgian expatriate sportspeople in France